Herman Boelen (born 12 May 1939) is a retired Dutch rower. He competed at the 1964 Summer Olympics in the coxless fours, together with Jim Enters, Sipke Castelein and Sjoerd Wartena, and finished in fourth place. He won a European bronze in the coxless pairs with Enters in 1963.

Boelen's daughter Femke is also an Olympic rower. After retiring from competitions he worked as a rowing coach with the national junior team and as the chairman of his rowing club Willem III in Amsterdam. In 2005 he became Knight of the Order of Orange-Nassau.

References

1939 births
Living people
Dutch male rowers
Olympic rowers of the Netherlands
Rowers at the 1964 Summer Olympics
Rowers from Amsterdam
European Rowing Championships medalists
20th-century Dutch people
21st-century Dutch people